Sirri Island Airport  is a regional airport on an island, located near the city of Sirri, Hormozgan Province, in south of Iran. The airport is being used by the Iran Ministry of Petroleum for transferring of employees of the Iran Oil Company.

Airlines and destinations

See also 
 List of airlines of Iran

References

Transportation in Hormozgan Province
Airports in Iran
Buildings and structures in Hormozgan Province